Pine Lake Township may refer to the following places in the U.S. state of Minnesota:

 Pine Lake Township, Cass County, Minnesota
 Pine Lake Township, Clearwater County, Minnesota
 Pine Lake Township, Otter Tail County, Minnesota
 Pine Lake Township, Pine County, Minnesota

See also

 Pine Lake (disambiguation)

Township name disambiguation pages